Westside School can refer to many schools including:

 Westside School (Gibraltar)
 Las Vegas Grammar School (Washington and D Streets, Las Vegas, Nevada) or Westside School
 Westside School, now the Garfield School in the Olympia School District in Thurston County, Washington, U.S.

See also 
 Westside High School (disambiguation)
 Westside School District. Johnson County, Arkansas
 West Side School District, Cleburne County, Arkansas
 Westside Consolidated School District, Craighead County, Arkansas